Todd Porter (born November 17, 1960) is an American politician. He is a member of the North Dakota House of Representatives from the 34th District, serving since 1999. He is a member of the Republican party. Porter has been chairman of the House Energy and Natural Resources Committee since 2007. In 2019, controversy arose over Porter's business links to President of the North Dakota Petroleum Council and lobbyist Ron Ness. Porter denied that the links had any effect on his legislative behaviour.

References

Living people
1960 births
Politicians from Bismarck, North Dakota
Republican Party members of the North Dakota House of Representatives
21st-century American politicians